In graph theory, a string graph is an intersection graph of curves in the plane; each curve is called a "string".

Background 
 described a concept similar to string graphs as they applied to genetic structures. In that context, he also posed the specific case of intersecting intervals on a line, namely the now classical family of interval graphs. Later,  specified the same idea to electrical networks and printed circuits. The mathematical study of string graphs began with the paper  and 
through a collaboration between Sinden and Ronald Graham, where the characterization of string graphs eventually came to be posed as an open question at the 5th Hungarian Colloquium on Combinatorics in 1976. However, the recognition of string graphs was eventually proven to be NP-complete, implying that no simple characterization is likely to exist.

Related graph classes

Every planar graph is a string graph: one may form a string graph representation of an arbitrary plane-embedded graph by drawing a string for each vertex that loops around the vertex and around the midpoint of each adjacent edge, as shown in the figure. For any edge uv of the graph, the strings for u and v cross each other twice near the midpoint of uv, and there are no other crossings, so the pairs of strings that cross represent exactly the adjacent pairs of vertices of the original planar graph. Alternatively, by the circle packing theorem, any planar graph may be represented as a collection of circles, any two of which cross if and only if the corresponding vertices are adjacent; these circles (with a starting and ending point chosen to turn them into open curves) provide a string graph representation of the given planar graph.  proved that every planar graph has a string representation in which each pair of strings has at most one crossing point, unlike the representations described above.
Scheinerman's conjecture, now proven, is the even stronger statement that every planar graph may be represented by the intersection graph of straight line segments, a very special case of strings.

If every edge of a given graph G is subdivided, the resulting graph is a string graph if and only if G is planar. In particular, the subdivision of the complete graph K5 shown in the illustration is not a string graph, because K5 is not planar.

Every circle graph, as an intersection graph of line segments (the chords of a circle), is also a string graph. Every chordal graph may be represented as a string graph: chordal graphs are intersection graphs of subtrees of trees, and one may form a string representation of a chordal graph by forming a planar embedding of the corresponding tree and replacing each subtree by a string that traces around the subtree's edges.

The complement graph of every comparability graph is also a string graph.

Other results
 showed computing the chromatic number of string graphs to be NP-hard.  found that string graphs form an induced minor closed class, but not a minor closed class of graphs.

Every m-edge string graph can be partitioned into two subsets, each a constant fraction the size of the whole graph, by the removal of O(m3/4log1/2m) vertices. It follows that the biclique-free string graphs, string graphs containing no Kt,t subgraph for some constant t, have O(n) edges and more strongly have polynomial expansion.

Notes

References 
.
.
.
.
.
.
.
.
.
.
.
.
.
.

Topological graph theory
Intersection classes of graphs